L’Etat Et Moi is the second full-length studio album by the German rock band Blumfeld and was released in August 1994. L’Etat Et Moi is considered one of the most important albums in the Hamburger Schule movement.

Miscellaneous
The album was released by the Hamburg-based label Zickzack and by Big Cat Records. The British independent record label also distributed the album internationally. Zickzack re-released L’Etat Et Moi in 2001. It has been distributed by the label Blumfeld Tonträger since 2007.

The cover art is a parody of Elvis Presley’s 1959 album 50,000,000 Elvis Fans Can't Be Wrong.

During a joint tour in 1994, Blumfeld and the US indie rock band Pavement performed the song Verstärker/Amplifier together in Cologne.

Reception
German critics rate L’Etat Et Moi as a landmark album of German rock music.

The British magazine New Musical Express ranked it number 37 in the list of the best albums of 1995.

Musikexpress voted L’Etat Et Moi 6th in the list of the 100 best German albums of all time.

Track listing
All lyrics by Jochen Distelmeyer; with music by Eike Bohlken, Distelmeyer and André Rattay.

Draußen auf Kaution – 5:24 (“Out on parole”)
Jet Set – 2:13
2 oder 3 Dinge, die ich von Dir weiß – 2:55 (“2 or 3 things I know of you”)
Walkie, Talkie – 3:24
Eine eigene Geschichte – 3:52 (“An own story”)
Verstärker – 4:50 (“Amplifier”)
Ich-Wie es wirklich war – 2:57 (“Me - how it really was”)
L’Etat et Moi (Mein Vorgehen in 4, 5 Sätzen) – 5:25 (“The state and me (My approach in 4, 5 sentences)”)
Sing Sing – 5:14
Evergreen – 4:05
Superstarfighter – 2:44
You Make Me – 5:44

Production credits
Blumfeld
Jochen Distelmeyer – vocals, guitar, piano
Eike Bohlken – bass, guitar, harmonica, choir, chorus vocals
André Rattay – drums, percussion
Production
Blumfeld – producer, artwork, cover design
Chris Von Rautenkranz – producer, technician

Choir members
The song Superstarfighter features musician friends from the Hamburg area.

Svenja Rossa
Rocko Schamoni
Anne Schulte
Katta Schulte
Frank Spilker (Die Sterne)
Ralf Vidakovicz
Dirk von Lowtzow (Tocotronic)
Pascal Fuhlbrügge
Günther Jakob
Schorsch Kamerun (Die Goldenen Zitronen)
Tobias Levin
Jutta Postel
Tilman Rossmy (Die Regierung)

References

External links

1994 albums
Blumfeld albums
German-language albums